My Friends is a 1975 Italian comedy-drama film directed by Mario Monicelli.

The film project belonged to Pietro Germi, who had no chance to make it happen because of his untimely death. The opening credits of the film, in fact, paid tribute to the author with the words "a film by Pietro Germi" which is followed only later by "directed by Mario Monicelli".

The film, which made it to number one on the Italian box-office in front of Steven Spielberg's Jaws, was followed by two sequels, Amici miei Atto II (1982, also by Monicelli),  Amici miei Atto III (1985), directed by Nanni Loy.

Plot
Like in many other Monicelli movies, the main theme of Amici miei is friendship, seen from a rather bitter point of view.  It tells the story of four middle-aged friends in Florence who organize together idle pranks (called zingarate, "gypsy shenanigans") in a continuous attempt to prolong childhood during their adult life.

Count Mascetti (Ugo Tognazzi) is an impoverished noble who has no means to support his family, but does not renounce high living pleasures anyway, and has an underage mistress, Titti (Silvia Dionisio).  Perozzi (Philippe Noiret) is an easy-living journalist harassed by the unceasing disapproval of his wife and his son.  Melandri (Gastone Moschin) is an architect employed by City Hall (for the preservation and restoration of the City's countless monuments), whose main goal is to find the ideal woman.  Necchi (Duilio Del Prete) is the owner of a café and pool hall where the friends usually plan their zingarate.

During the movie, they are joined by a renowned, military-like surgeon, professor Alfeo Sassaroli (Adolfo Celi), in whose clinic they recover after being hospitalized, injured after a mismanaged zingarata.  Melandri falls in love with Sassaroli's wife, exclaiming "I've seen the Madonna!", only to discover she has psychological problems.

The plot is mostly composed of elaborate practical jokes organized by the friends, including the creation of a fake mafia mob (actually, from Marseille) in whose "criminal acts" they involve a pensioner, Righi (Bernard Blier), who used to snatch croissants from the cake tray in Necchi's café, and Mascetti's attempts to save his marriage despite his relationship with Titti.

The film ends with Perozzi's death, which still does not deprive his friends of their desecrating hijinks, not even in face of their own mortality. Instead, Perozzi's wife is skeptical at first, since she wonders if his death can actually be one of his pranks. Criticized by Melandri for her lack of tears, she comments: "One mourns if somebody dies.  But here, nobody died". Mascetti replies: "Well, he wasn't somebody, but I liked him".

During the funeral procession, they "pay homage" to their dead friend by telling the wide-eyed Righi that Perozzi was killed for being a traitor to their mafia. Melandri starts sobbing out of laughter, because Righi believed the hoax, while the other friends also break up. Righi, believing that they are heartbroken, is moved for real.

Cast
 Ugo Tognazzi as Lello Mascetti
 Gastone Moschin as Rambaldo Melandri
 Philippe Noiret as Giorgio Perozzi
 Duilio Del Prete as Guido Necchi
 Olga Karlatos as Donatella Sassaroli
 Silvia Dionisio as Titti
 Franca Tamantini as Carmen Necchi
 Angela Goodwin as Laura Perozzi
 Milena Vukotic as Alice Mascetti
 Bernard Blier as Niccolò Righi
 Adolfo Celi as Professor Alfeo Sassaroli
 Maurizio Scattorin as Luciano Perozzi (Perozzi's son)
 Ulla Johannsen as Titti's Lover (uncredited)

Other
 The project was begun by Pietro Germi, who could not finish it due to his death. Monicelli, who replaced him, moved the set from Bologna to Florence, as the filmmaker was raised in Tuscany (many of the zingarate illustrated in the movie were actually inspired by tricks and pranks played by Monicelli himself during his youth).
 In the original version Philippe Noiret is dubbed by Renzo Montagnani, who, in the sequels, replaced Del Prete as Necchi.
 One of the most popular scenes is that in which the four friends, to raise Melandri's mood after his falling out with Sassaroli's ex-wife, organize a zingarata consisting of slapping people's faces stretching out from the windows of a leaving train. One of the victims is Perozzi's son.
 The film was shot in Florence and its center was a real bar in Piazza Demidoff, along the River Arno, which was named "Bar Amici Miei" and featured posters of the film. In the 1990s the bar changed its name and was modernized becoming an American bar and losing all connections to the film.

References

External links

1975 films
1970s Italian-language films
1975 comedy-drama films
Commedia all'italiana
Films directed by Mario Monicelli
Films scored by Carlo Rustichelli
Films set in Florence
1975 comedy films
1975 drama films
Midlife crisis films
1970s Italian films